Caryapundy Parish is a civil land parish of Tongowoko County, New South Wales, corresponding to the area of former Caryapundy Station. It shares borders with Queensland, Tongowoko Parish, Calathunda Parish, and with Corriewelpie Parish of Delalah County (in the north, west, south, and east respectively).

See also
 Narriearra Caryapundy Swamp National Park
 Caryapundy Station

References

Parishes of Tongowoko County
Far West (New South Wales)